M. V. S. Haranatha Rao (27 July 1948 – 9 October 2017) was a noted Telugu playwright, script writer and actor. He wrote dialogues for more than 150 films. His notable films include Pratighatana, Anna, and Ammayi Kapuram, and he received five Nandi Awards.

M.V. S. Haranatha Rao entered the cine field through noted film maker T. Krishna. He worked as a story and dialogue writer for such award-winning films as Swayamkrushi, and Sutradharulu. He also played significant roles in Rakshasudu and Swayamkrushi. Most of his dialogues are progressive in nature and for the betterment of the society.

Personal life
M.V. S. Haranatha Rao studied in Guntur. He was interested in theater arts since his childhood. He started acting in stage dramas since his third standard. His father Rangacharyulu was a clerk  and mother was a carnatic music professional.

He used to go to mythological dramas along with his father. When his mother got transferred to Ongole, Haranatha Rao also went there and joined Sarma College.

He was married to Koteswari who is a Govt school teacher in Ongole. Haranatha Rao used to travel from Ongole to Chennai/Hyderabad to have a good work life balance. Koteswari supported Haranatha Rao in every aspect of life. They have three children (two sons and a daughter).

Theater
The first play he wrote was Rakta Bali (Blood sacrifice). He was a good friend of T. Krishna from his college days. They both used to work together on stage plays. After they witnessed dramas in Vijayawada as part of stage celebrations, he was inspired to do a thorough research and wrote a play called Jagannatha Ratha Chakralu (The wheels of chariot of Lord Jagannatha). This novel is about the philosophical existence of god. He got a critical response from people like Kodavatiganti, Gora, and Acharya Aatreya. He also got invitation to enter into film world, but he did not go.

His play Kanya Vara sulkam has won the best drama award of the Andhra Pradesh Cultural Affairs Department. Kshira Sagara Mathanam (Churning of mythological ocean) got him Sahitya academy award. In addition to writing the plays, he also directed and composed music for some of the plays.

In 1980, when Andhra Nataka Parishat, Rajamandri conducted competitions for stage plays and his four plays won 20 out of 25 awards.

List of stage plays 
 Raktabali
 Jagannatha Ratha Chakralu
 Kshirasagara Mathanam
 Antham Kadidi Arambham
 Yakshaganam
 Redlight Area
 Mee Peremiti?
 Boochi
 Adavilo aksharalu
 Ledi panja
 Tere naam
 Harmonium
 Thalangu Thakadhimi
 Janani Jaiahe
 Khadga Srushti
 Prajakavi Vemana
 Naivedyam

Filmography 
He wrote dialogues for more than 150 films. He received four Nandi Awards for the films Pratighatana, Bharata Nari, Anna, Ammayi Kapuram, Idaa Prapancham for his story/dialogues. He also acted in more than 30 films.

As a writer 

Pratighatana
Bharata Nari
Idaa Prapancham
Desamlo Dongalu Paddaru
Devalayam
Repati Pourulu
Manchi Donga
Yuddha Bhoomi
Rakshasudu
Ramayanam
Inspector Pratap
Dharma Chakram
Adapilla
Adigo Alladigo
Akali neku Joharlu
Ammayi Kapuram
Anna
Aruna Kiranam
Athagaru Swagatham
Bharatha SimhaReddy
Broker (2010 film)
Chalo Assembly
Desam lo dongalu paddaru
Devalayam
Dr. Ambedker
Emandi Avidochindi
Jai (2004 Telugu film)
Kallu
Kodukulu
Kondapalli Rattaya
Kuthuru
Leader
M Dharma Raju MA
Ma ayina bangaram
Manavudu Dhanavudu
Manchi Donga
M.L.A. Yedukondalu
Modilla Muchata
Nenu Saitam
Paruvu pretishta
Praanam
Punyabhumi nadesam
Sagatu manishi
Sardhar krishnama naidu
Seetakka
Sutradharulu
Srimathi velostha
Stuvartu puram police station
Subhapradam
Swarnakka
Swati Kiranam
Yerra Mandaram
Yuddha Bhoomi
Vande Mataram (1985 film)
Taraka Ramudu
Navayugam
Encounter
Repati Rowdy
Pichipullaiah
Atha nekoduku jagartha
Oka yadardha prema katha
Vadani malli
Vadina gari gajulu
Vamsam
Gunda rajyam
Mamatala kovela
Pathala Bhairavi (Hindi) - Translated by khadar khan
Andam

As an Actor 
 Rakshasudu
 Aadapilla
 Chitram
 Devalayam
 Swayamkrushi
 Dharma Chakram
 Broker
 Hora hori
 M Dharma Raju MA
 Bhargava Ramudu
 Paruvu Pretishta
 Moodilla muchata
 1 2 3 from Amalapuram
 Sambhavami Yuge yuge
 Akali neku joharlu
 Artharatri Swatantram
 Chalo Assembly
 Gunda rajyam
 Kulala kurukshetram

Awards 
 Nandi Awards               
  Best Dialogue Writer,1985 - Pratighatana 
  Best Dialogue Writer ,1987 - Idaa Prapancham 
  Best Dialogue Writer ,1989 - Bharata naari 
  Best Dialogue Writer  ,1994 - Anna
 Best Story Writer  ,1995 - Ammayi Kapuram  

 Other Awards
  AndhraPradesh Sahitya Academy Award for Best Writer 
  Pinnisetty Smarka Award 
 Acharya Aatreya Award 
 Dasari Swarna Kankanam 
 Putchalapalli Sundaraiah Smaraka Award 
 Chatla Sriramulu Trust Award 
 Kandukuri Rangasthala Award

References

External links

1948 births
2017 deaths
Telugu male actors
Telugu screenwriters
Indian male screenwriters
People from Guntur
20th-century Indian male actors
20th-century Indian dramatists and playwrights
21st-century Indian male actors
21st-century Indian dramatists and playwrights
Indian male dramatists and playwrights
20th-century Indian male writers
21st-century Indian male writers
Indian male stage actors
Screenwriters from Andhra Pradesh